Kuzhavadaiyan is a village in the Udayarpalayam taluk of Ariyalur district, Tamil Nadu, India.

Location

Kuzhavadaiyan is located 255 km from Chennai. On the south it is around 30 km from Kumbakonam via Anaikkarai bridge. On the east it is 38 km from Ariyalur. On the north it is 25 km from Srimueshnam, and 36 km from Viruthachalam. On the east it is 50 km from Chidambaram.

Demographics

As of the 2001 census of India, Jayankondam had a population of 31,268 comprising 15,532 males and 15,736 females, making the sex ratio (number of females per thousand males) of the town 1,013. A total of 3,716 people were under six years of age and the child sex ratio (number of females per thousand males under six years of age) stood at 1,003. The town had an average literacy of 77.18%, higher than the national average of 59.5%. A total of 5,544, comprising 20.12% of the population, belonged to Scheduled Castes (SC) and 549, comprising 1.99% of the population, belonged to Scheduled tribes (ST). There were a total of 7,022 households in the town. As of 2001, Jayankondam had a total of 9,694 main workers: 967 cultivators, 1,361 agricultural labourers, 1,867 in household industries and 5,499 other workers. There was a total of 1,938 marginal workers: 136 marginal cultivators, 1,068 marginal agricultural labourers, 196 marginal workers in household industries and 538 other marginal workers.

Places near Kuzhavadaiyan
Gangaikonda Cholapuram temple is the place around 10 km. North from JKM is the ancient temple and built by Rajendra chozha having very ancient – oldest sculpture and drowning.

Anaikarai Bridge is 2.5 km from Kuzhavadaiyan.

College 
 Indra College, Kuzhavadaiyan

Schools 
 Gokilambal group of schools 
 Gokilambal matriculation school
 Gokilambal International school (CBSE)
Gokilambal NEET Academy
 Indra Public School, Kuzhavadaiyan
 panjayath union middil school

Hospitals

Bank and ATMs

References

Villages in Ariyalur district